Beware of Safety, commonly abbreviated as BoS, is an instrumental post-rock band from Los Angeles, California. The band plays sprawling, instrumental rock that could be classified as post-metal, post-rock, and even math rock. Beware of Safety has six official releases in its catalog: It Is Curtains (2007), dogs (2009), Giants/BoS Split 7" (2011), Leaves/Scars (2011), Lotusville (2014), and Mabon (2015). The band has released albums with The Mylene Sheath in the USA as well as Friend of Mine Records in Japan, and has toured throughout the USA and Europe highlighted by performances with Caspian, El Ten Eleven, If These Trees Could Talk, Té, sleepmakeswaves, Maserati, The American Dollar and Junius, among others.

The band has received a notable amount of press for their album dogs, including a write-up in Wired Magazine's Sunday Soundtracking.

In early 2009, Tad Piecka joined BoS on bass, expanding the band to five members.

The creation of 2011's Leaves/Scars was a tumultuous time for BoS with members contemplating quitting the band.

Beware of Safety's 2014 album Lotusville reflects the band's experiences living in Los Angeles, California.

Member Morgan Hendry is also an engineer at Jet Propulsion Lab.

Members
 Adam Kay - Guitar
 Jeff Zemina - Guitar
 Morgan Hendry - Drums, Keyboards
 Steve Molter - Guitar
 Tad Piecka - Bass

Discography

Albums
 dogs - (CD/LP, The Mylene Sheath, 2009)
 Leaves/Scars - (CD/LP, The Mylene Sheath, 2011)
 Lotusville - (CD/LP, 2014)
 Mabon - (CD/LP, 2015)

EPs
 It Is Curtains - (CD/LP, The Mylene Sheath, 2007)
 Mabon - (digital release, 2015 / LP, dunk!records, 2020)

References

External links
Official website
Beware of Safety on Bandcamp

Musical groups from Los Angeles
Rock music groups from California
American post-rock groups
American post-metal musical groups
Musical groups established in 2005